In Greek mythology, Echemus (Ekhemos) was the Tegean king of Arcadia who succeeded Lycurgus.

Family 
Echemus was the son of Aeropus, son of King Cepheus. He was married to Timandra, daughter of Leda and Tyndareus of Sparta. Timandra bore him a son, Ladocus, before deserting Echemus for Phyleus, the king of Dulichium.

Mythology 
After the death of Eurystheus, Hyllus led the Heracleidae to attack Mycenae. Echemus offered himself as the champion of the defending Arcadian forces and killed Hyllus in single combat, thus forcing the Heracleidae to withdraw. This story is mentioned by the Tegeans as an example of their people's bravery in book 9 of The History by Herodotus.

Echemus was the victor in wrestling during the first Olympic games established by Heracles.

Notes

References
Hesiod, Catalogue of Women from Homeric Hymns, Epic Cycle, Homerica translated by Evelyn-White, H G. Loeb Classical Library Volume 57. London: William Heinemann, 1914. Online version at theio.com
Pausanias, Description of Greece with an English Translation by W.H.S. Jones, Litt.D., and H.A. Ormerod, M.A., in 4 Volumes. Cambridge, MA, Harvard University Press; London, William Heinemann Ltd. 1918. . Online version at the Perseus Digital Library
Pausanias, Graeciae Descriptio. 3 vols. Leipzig, Teubner. 1903.  Greek text available at the Perseus Digital Library.
Pindar, Odes translated by Diane Arnson Svarlien. 1990. Online version at the Perseus Digital Library.
Pindar, The Odes of Pindar including the Principal Fragments with an Introduction and an English Translation by Sir John Sandys, Litt.D., FBA. Cambridge, MA., Harvard University Press; London, William Heinemann Ltd. 1937. Greek text available at the Perseus Digital Library.

Further reading 
March, J., Cassell's Dictionary of Classical Mythology, London, 1999. 

Mythological kings of Arcadia

Kings in Greek mythology
Arcadian characters in Greek mythology
Ancient Tegeans
Arcadian mythology
Tegea